This article contains the family trees of members of the Sun clan, who ruled the state of Eastern Wu (229–280), in the Three Kingdoms period (220–280), in China.

Sun Jian, Sun Qiang and Sun Jing

Sun Jian was an alleged descendant of Sun Tzu, the author of The Art of War.

Sun Jian and Sun Qiang were twin brothers. Sun Jing was a younger brother of Sun Jian. Sun Jian had a younger sister,  Lady Sun, who married Xu Zhen.

Xu Zhen and Sun Jian's younger sister had a son, Xu Kun. Xu Kun's daughter married Sun Jian's son Sun Quan.

Sun Jian

Four of Sun Jian's sons – Sun Ce, Sun Quan, Sun Yi and Sun Kuang – and one of his daughters (Lady Sun) were born to his wife Lady Wu, who was Wu Jing's elder sister. Lady Sun married Liu Bei.

One of the two other daughters was born to Sun Jian's concubine Lady Chen, and she married Pan Jun's son Pan Mi.

It is not known who the mothers of the fifth son (Sun Lang) and the last daughter were. The last daughter was married to Hong Zi.

Sun Ce

Sun Ce married Da Qiao, the older of Elder Qiao's two daughters. Zhou Yu married the younger daughter Xiao Qiao.

Sun Ce's son was Sun Shao. Sun Shao's son was Sun Feng. Sun Ce had several daughters: one married Gu Yong's son Gu Shao, another married Lu Xun, and another married Zhu Zhi's son Zhu Ji. It is not known whether Sun Ce's children were born to Da Qiao or not.

During the Tang dynasty, an unnamed 13th-generation patrilineal descendant of Sun Ce was recorded to have served as a Buddhist master at the Lingyin Temple.

Sun Quan

Sun Quan had ten wives: Lady Xie; Lady Yuan; Lady Zhao; Lady Xu; Empress Dayi, née Wang; Consort Xie; Consort Zhong; Empress Jinghuai, née Wang; Empress Pan; Bu Lianshi. Lady Yuan was Yuan Shu's daughter; Lady Zhao was Zhao Yuan's sister; Lady Xie was Xie Jiong's daughter; Lady Xu was Xu Kun's daughter; Empress Dayi was Wang Lujiu's daughter. Sun Quan had seven sons: Sun Deng, Sun He, Sun Ba, Sun Fen, Sun Xiu, Sun Liang and Sun Lü. Sun Quan had three daughters: Sun Luban, Sun Luyu, and a third one, whose name is unknown.

Lady Xu was Sun Deng's adoptive mother; Empress Dayi bore Sun He; Consort Xie bore Sun Ba; Consort Zhong bore Sun Fen; Empress Jinghuai bore Sun Xiu; Empress Pan bore Sun Liang; Bu Lianshi bore Sun Luban and Sun Luyu. It is unknown who the mothers of Sun Lü and the third daughter were. Sun Quan's third daughter was married to Zhu Ju initially, but was later remarried to Liu Zuan.

Sun Deng

Sun Deng married Zhou Yu's daughter. He had three sons: Sun Fan, Sun Xi and Sun Ying. It is unknown whether his three sons were born to Lady Zhou or not.

Sun Ba

Sun Ba married the daughter of Liu Yao's son Liu Ji. Sun Ba had two sons: Sun Ji and Sun Yi. It is not stated whether his sons were born to Lady Liu or not.

Sun He (Zixiao)

Sun He had two wives: Consort Zhang and Lady He. Consort Zhang was the daughter of Zhang Zhao's son Zhang Cheng and Zhuge Jin's daughter. Lady He was the daughter of He Sui.

Sun He had four sons – Sun Jun, Sun Hao, Sun De and Sun Qian – and one daughter, whose name is unknown. Sun Hao was born to Lady He, Sun Jun and the daughter were born to Consort Zhang, while the identities of the mothers of Sun De and Sun Qian are unknown. Sun He's daughter married Lu Jing, the son of Lu Kang (Lu Xun's son) and Lady Zhang (another daughter of Zhang Cheng). Both Sun He's daughter and Lu Jing were therefore Zhang Cheng's maternal grandchildren.

Sun Hao (Yuanzong)

Sun Hao had three wives. Two of them were Zhang Bu's daughters. The third one was Teng Mu's daughter Teng Fanglan.

Sun Hao's biography in the Sanguozhi stated:

Wang Jun's biography in the Jin Shu confirmed the identity of the "Prince of Lu" as Sun Qian. The biography of Emperor Yuan in the Jin Shu mentioned Sun Hao's son Sun Fan, while the biography of Zhou Chu mentioned Sun Hao's son Sun Chong. It might be possible that Sun Fan and Sun Chong were among the 32 sons (seven of whom were known by their princely titles), apart from Sun Jin and the Prince of Lu (Sun Qian), mentioned in Sun Hao's biography. Otherwise, Sun Hao would have had 36 sons in total.

There are no records of Sun Hao's daughters nor any records of the identities of the mothers of his sons.

Sun Xiu

Sun Xiu married Empress Zhu, the daughter of Zhu Ju and Sun Luyu (Sun Xiu's half-sister).

Sun Xiu had four sons: Sun Wan, Sun Gong, Sun Mang and Sun Bao. It is not stated whether Sun Xiu's four sons were born to Empress Zhu or not.

Sun Liang

Sun Liang married Quan Huijie, the daughter of Quan Shang.

Sun Yi

Sun Yi was married to Lady Xu, they had a son, Sun Song.

Sun Kuang

Sun Kuang married the daughter of Cao Cao's younger brother. They had a son, Sun Tai. Sun Tai's son was Sun Xiu. Sun Xiu's son was Sun Jian.

Sun Qiang

Sun Qiang had two sons: Sun Ben and Sun Fu. Sun Ben was elder than Sun Fu.

Sun Ben

Sun Ben had four sons: Sun Lin, Sun An, Sun Xi and Sun Ji. Sun Lin was the eldest of the four. Sun Ben also had a daughter, who was married to Cao Cao's son Cao Zhang.

Sun Lin had six sons: Sun Miao, Sun Lü, Sun Shu, Sun Zhen, Sun Xie and Sun Xin.

Sun Fu

Sun Fu had four sons: Sun Xing, Sun Zhao, Sun Wei and Sun Xin. He also had a daughter, who was married to Luo Tong.

Sun Jing

Sun Jing had five sons: Sun Hao, Sun Yu, Sun Jiao, Sun Huan and Sun Qian.

Sun Hao (Sun Jing's son)

Sun Hao had three sons: Sun Chuo, Sun Chao and Sun Gong.

Sun Gong's son was Sun Jun. Sun Jun's elder sister married Quan Shang. Sun Jun's younger sister married Zhu Ju's son Zhu Sun.

Sun Chuo had five sons: Sun Chen, Sun Ju, Sun En, Sun Gan and Sun Kai. Sun Chen was the eldest of the five sons.

Sun Yu

Sun Yu had five sons: Sun Mi, Sun Xi, Sun Yao, Sun Man and Sun Hong.

Sun Jiao

Sun Jiao had five sons: Sun Yin, Sun Xi, Sun Zi, Sun Mi and Sun Yi. Sun Xi was younger than Sun Yin. The other three were all younger than Sun Xi.

Sun Huan

Sun Huan had three sons: Sun Cheng, Sun Yi and Sun Feng. Sun Yi was born to Sun Huan's concubine and was younger than Sun Cheng. Sun Feng was younger than Sun Yi. Sun Huan also had two daughters who were younger than Sun Yi. One of the daughters married Teng Yin while the other married Lü Ju.

Sun He (Bohai)

Sun He was a distant relative of the Sun clan, and his original family name was Yu (俞). He was favoured by Sun Ce, who granted him and his immediate family the family name "Sun" and inducted them into the Sun clan. Sun He had four sons: Sun Zhu, Sun Yi, Sun Huan and Sun Jun (ranked in order of seniority from left to right).

Sun Jun had two sons: Sun Jian and Sun Shen. Sun Jian was elder than Sun Shen. Sun Shen's son was Sun Cheng.

Sun Shao was a son of Sun He's younger brother. He had five sons: Sun Kai, Sun Yue, Sun Yi, Sun Yi and Sun Hui. Sun Kai was elder than Sun Yue. The other three were all younger than Sun Kai but it is unknown whether they were elder than Sun Yue or not.

See also
 Cao Wei family trees
 Shu Han family trees
 Family tree of Sima Yi

References

 Chen, Shou (3rd century). Records of the Three Kingdoms (Sanguozhi).
 Dong, You, ed. (1819). "Tang Hangzhou Lingyin Shan Tianzhu Si Dadeshen Fashi Ta Ming" (唐杭州靈隱山天竺寺大德詵法師塔銘) in Quan Tang Wen (全唐文) volume 918.
 Fang, Xuanling (648). Book of Jin (Jin Shu).
 Pei, Songzhi (5th century). Annotations to Records of the Three Kingdoms (Sanguozhi zhu).

Eastern Wu
Dynasty genealogy